Verna L. Clayton (born February 28, 1937) is an American politician.

Born in Hamden, Ohio, Clayton went to Oklahoma State University, Harper College, and University of Illinois. She served as the clerk for Buffalo Grove, Illinois from 1971 to 1979 and then served as the mayor of Buffalo Grove from 1979 to 1991. Clayton served in the Illinois House of Representatives from 1993 to 1999 and was a Republican.

Notes

1937 births
Living people
People from Buffalo Grove, Illinois
People from Hamden, Ohio
Oklahoma State University alumni
University of Illinois Urbana-Champaign alumni
Women state legislators in Illinois
Mayors of places in Illinois
Republican Party members of the Illinois House of Representatives
Women mayors of places in Illinois
21st-century American women